Xi Aquarii (ξ Aquarii, abbreviated Xi Aqr, ξ Aqr) is a binary star system in the equatorial constellation of Aquarius. It is visible to the naked eye with an apparent visual magnitude of 4.7.

The two components are designated Xi Aquarii A (also named Bunda) and B.

Nomenclature 

ξ Aquarii (Latinised to Xi Aquarii) is the binary's Bayer designation. The designations of the two components as Xi Aquarii A and B derive from the convention used by the Washington Multiplicity Catalog (WMC) for multiple star systems, and adopted by the International Astronomical Union (IAU).

Along with Beta Aquarii (Sadalsuud) it constituted the Persian lunar mansion Bunda. In 2016, the IAU organized a Working Group on Star Names (WGSN) to catalog and standardize proper names for stars. The WGSN decided to attribute proper names to individual stars rather than entire multiple systems. It approved the name Bunda for the component Xi Aquarii A on 1 June 2018 and it is now so included in the List of IAU-approved Star Names.

Properties 

Xi Aquarii is a single-lined spectroscopic binary system, which means that the presence of an unseen orbiting companion can be inferred from Doppler shifts in the spectral absorption lines. The two bodies orbit each other with a period of 8,016 days (22 y) and an eccentricity of 0.54. The primary component, Xi Aquarii A, is an A-type main sequence star with a stellar classification of A7 V. It has about 1.9 times the mass of the Sun and is rotating rapidly with a projected rotational velocity of 170 km/s. The orbital data is consistent with the secondary component, Xi Aquarii B, being either a red dwarf or a white dwarf star.

References

External links
 Image ξ Aqr

Spectroscopic binaries
Aquarius (constellation)
Aquarii, Xi
Aquarii, 023
205767
106786
A-type main-sequence stars
Bunda
8264
BD-08 5701